(French) or  (Dutch) is one of the 19 municipalities of the Brussels-Capital Region, Belgium. Located to the south-east of Brussels' city centre, it is geographically bisected by the City of Brussels. It is also bordered by the municipalities of Auderghem, Etterbeek, Forest, Uccle, Saint-Gilles and Watermael-Boitsfort.

, the municipality had a population of 87,052 inhabitants. In common with all of Brussels' municipalities, it is legally bilingual (French–Dutch). It is generally considered an affluent area of the city and is particularly noted for its communities of European and Congolese immigrants.

Geography
Ixelles is located in the south-east of Brussels and is divided into two parts by the Avenue Louise/Louizalaan, which is part of the City of Brussels. The municipality's smaller western part includes the Rue du Bailli/Baljuwstraat and extends roughly from the Avenue Louise to the /, whilst its larger eastern part includes campuses of Brussels' two leading universities; the French-speaking Université libre de Bruxelles (ULB) and the Dutch-speaking Vrije Universiteit Brussel (VUB), along with the Place Eugène Flagey. The Bois de la Cambre/Ter Kamerenbos is located just south of Ixelles.

The construction of the Avenue Louise was commissioned in 1847 as a monumental avenue bordered by chestnut trees that would allow easy access from Brussels' city centre to the popular recreational area of the Bois de la Cambre. It was also to be the first Haussmann-esque artery of the city. Originally, fierce resistance to the project was put up by the town of Ixelles—then, as now, a separate municipality (local authority) from the City of Brussels—through whose territory the avenue was to run. After years of fruitless negotiations, Brussels finally annexed the narrow band of land needed for the avenue, in addition to the Bois de la Cambre itself, in 1864. That decision accounts for the unusual shape of today's City of Brussels and for the separation of Ixelles into two separate areas.

History

Medieval origins
The placename was first mentioned in 1210 as Elsela, from the Old Dutch , meaning alder woods. The origins of the village date from the foundation of La Cambre Abbey. Hendrik I, Duke of Brabant, donated the Pennebeke domain (Pennebeek was the original name of the Maalbeek spring) to the Cistercian nun Gisela in 1201. She in turn founded the Abbey, and in 1210, acquired property on which the duke ordered the construction of a mill. The marshlands around the Abbey were later drained and sanitised, which resulted in four springs which served as a source of fish for the Abbey's inhabitants and the neighbouring hamlets. The Abbey was located near the springs of the Maelbeek river in the Sonian Forest, the remnant of which closest to Brussels became known as the Bois de la Cambre/Ter Kamerenbos in the 19th century. The Abbey was recognised by Jan III van Bethune, the Bishop of Cambrai, in 1202, soon after its foundation. The saints Boniface of Brussels and Alice of Schaerbeek were two of its most famous residents in the 13th century.

Around 1300, during the reign of John II, Duke of Brabant, a hostel was built near the Abbey to provide meals to the wood bearers working in the forest. Soon, a hamlet and a couple of chapels were built, including the Church of the Holy Cross, also inaugurated by the Bishop of Cambrai and dedicated to Mary and the Holy Cross in 1459 (the Bishop of Cambrai is said to have brought two pieces of the original cross with him). Initially, these hamlets and provisions were constructed for the labourers that helped drain and sanitise the marshlands. At that time, part of Ixelles was a dependence of Brussels; the other part was the property of the local lord.

Before the Revolution
In 1478, the wars between Louis XI of France and Maximilian I, Holy Roman Emperor, brought devastation to the Abbey and the surrounding areas. In 1585, during the period of the Habsburg Netherlands, the Spanish burnt down most of the buildings to prevent them from being used as a refuge by Calvinists. The Abbey was restored in time for the Joyous Entry of the Archdukes Albert and Isabella in 1599. Further manors and castles (Ermitage, Ten Bosch and Ixelles, for example) were built in Ixelles in the 16th century, gradually transforming the hamlet into a full-fledged village.

Thanks to the Maalbeek springs and the purity of its waters, a brewing industry became active in the area. It started inside the Abbey, but by the 16th century, had expanded beyond its walls. Due to the liberalisation of beer manufacturing by the Council of Brabant in 1602, the industry grew, which resulted in a lively scene by the banks of the spring. By the 17th and 18th centuries, around 20 breweries-cabarets had settled in Ixelles, among which Saint-Hubert, De Sterre and L'Italie.

Independent municipality
In 1795, like many other towns surrounding Brussels, Ixelles was proclaimed a separate municipality by the French regime after the Revolution. The municipalities of Neder-Elsene ("Lower Ixelles", where the Abbey is located), Opper-Elsene ("Upper Ixelles", a Brussels suburb), Boondaal, Tenbos, and Solbos, all became part of Ixelles. Moreover, the Abbey was stripped of its religious functions, becoming among others a cotton-manufacturing plant, a farm, a military school, and a hospital. Many of the medieval gates of Brussels that lined what is now the Small Ring were taken down and more streets were built to accommodate the migration towards the suburbs. Ixelles' population grew nearly one-hundredfold, from 677 in 1813 to more than 58,000 in 1900. With this intense growth also came the Francisation of the municipality.

At the end of the 19th century, some of the ponds were drained, leaving only the so-called "Ixelles Ponds", and a new Church of the Holy Cross was built in 1860. The first trams appeared in 1884 and the first cinema in 1919. By then, Ixelles and the Avenue Louise had become one of the most fashionable areas of Brussels. Artists and celebrities moved in, leading to architectural novelties such as Art Nouveau and Art Deco.

Matongé

Ixelles is known throughout Belgium for its large community of people of African origin. This population is mainly concentrated near the Namur Gate and the /, and the neighbourhood is nicknamed Matongé or Matongué after the marketplace and commercial district with the same name in Kalamu, Kinshasa (Democratic Republic of the Congo). The core of Matongé was formed in late 1950s by the foundation of Maisaf (an abbreviation of Maison Africaine or African House) which served as a centre and residence for university students from the Belgian Congo. After Congolese independence in 1960, the district faced an influx of immigrants from the new state who shaped the neighbourhood in a style to resemble the original Matongé. During the sixties and into the seventies, the area was a well known meeting place for students and diplomats from Zaire. At the time they were known locally as Belgicains.  There are also communities from other African countries, mainly from Rwanda, Burundi, Mali, Cameroon, and Senegal, present in the district.

The famous shopping arcades; the Galerie d'Ixelles and the Galerie de la Porte de Namur, are both located in the heart of Matongé. In the gallery and the adjoining streets, a large number of specialised food shops and suppliers can be found. The area is renowned for its clothes, shoes and material shops, hairdressers and wigmakers, booksellers, jewellers and craft shops, making the area unmissable for many local and even international visitors, men and women, young and old. Over 45 different nationalities amongst the residents and shopkeepers can be counted, including most African countries. Statistically, many of the shopkeepers are not necessarily local residents. Amongst the visitors and window shoppers to Matongé are many who appreciate African fashion and the lifestyle.

The district also attained notoriety from the early 2000s with gang violence perpetrated by African gangs, partly composed of exiled child soldiers like Black Démolition. It was the scene of race riots in January 2001. Matongé, with its more recent immigrant communities from Latin America, Pakistan, and India along with African ones, is seen as a symbol of multiculturalism in Belgium. The local authorities, community groups and residents with a certain degree of success have more recently re-established the area as a safe place to visit. As the area and property ages there is increased pressure and interest from property developers to expand the European Quarter on one side and the fashionable Avenue Louise on the other, effectively Matongé is sandwiched between the two.

Every year since 2001 at the end of June, a successful multi-cultural festival, Matongé en Couleurs, has been organised in the area. The date coincides with the celebration of Congolese independence. The film Juju Factory, released in 2006, was partly filmed in the area. The local television channel BX1 (formerly Télé Bruxelles) broadcasts a weekly magazine programme, Téle Matongé XL.

The pedestrian street / is full of snack-bars where African food is sold. Most of these have been decorated by the famous Afro-European artist John Bush. Le Soleil d'Afrique has almost become his museum, with not only his original paintings on display, but also other painted surfaces and furniture.

Main sights
 The buildings of La Cambre Abbey, close to the territory of Ixelles, house a renowned school for the visual arts, the National Geographic Institute, and various parish functions.
 The Ixelles Ponds and Tenbosch Park are noted parks in the middle of the municipality.
 The Streamline Moderne Flagey Building on the Place Eugène Flagey, also known as the Maison de la Radio, used to house the Belgian National Institute of Radio Broadcasting (INR/NIR).
 The Résidence de la Cambre, the first high-rise building in Brussels, on the /, is another notable Art Deco building.
 Ixelles was a centre of Art Nouveau architecture in the first decades of the 20th century. Several Art Nouveau houses built by Victor Horta are listed as a UNESCO World Heritage Site, and some of them can be visited.
 The three Brussels universities—Université libre de Bruxelles (ULB), Vrije Universiteit Brussel (VUB) and Saint-Louis University—have campuses in Ixelles. As a result, the south-eastern part of the municipality is home to a large number of students.
 Ixelles Cemetery is one of the most important cemeteries in the country as it contains the graves of a number of famous Belgian personalities. It was there, in 1891, that the French General Georges Boulanger, leader of the right-wing Boulangerists, committed suicide, on the tomb of his mistress, who had died a couple of months earlier.
 Ixelles also houses several interesting churches and museums, including a fine-arts museum and the Constantin Meunier Museum established in the residence where the artist lived part of his life.

Events
Several fairs are organised in Ixelles, including the Spring Fair on the Place Eugène Flagey, which takes place between the fourth and sixth Sunday after Easter, as well as the Boondael Fair at the end of July.

Demographics
Migrant communities in Ixelles with over 1,000 people as of 1 January 2020:

Politics
The current city council was elected in the October 2018 elections.

International relations

Twin towns and sister cities
Ixelles is twinned with:
  Biarritz, France (since 1958)
  Kalamu, municipality in Kinshasa, Democratic Republic of the Congo (since 2003)
  Zababdeh, Palestine (since 2003)
  Kibbutz Megiddo, Israel (since 2012)
  Lichtenberg, Germany

Notable people

Born in Ixelles:

 Agnès Varda (1928-2019), film director
 Albert Crahay (1903–1991), soldier and commander of the Belgian battalion at the Battle of the Imjin River during the Korean War
 Anna Boch (1848–1936), impressionist painter, art collector
 Annemie Neyts (b. 1944), politician and MEP
 Audrey Hepburn (1929–1993), British actress, model, and humanitarian
 Auguste Alfred Lucien Lameere (1864–1942), entomologist
 Auguste Perret (1874–1954), architect
 Boris Szulzinger (b. 1945), film director and producer
 Camille Lemonnier (1844–1913), writer and poet
 Emile Vandervelde (1866–1938), statesman, Minister of Justice, and Minister of Foreign Affairs
 Frank Ntilikina (b. 1998), professional basketball player
 Grand Jojo (1936–2021), singer-songwriter
 Michel Regnier, also known as Greg (1931–1999), comic book author
 Jacky Ickx (b. 1945), racing driver
 Jaco Van Dormael (b. 1957), screenwriter and film director
 Jacques Feyder (1885–1948), screenwriter and film director
 Jean-François van Boxmeer (b. 1961), businessman, former Chairman and CEO of Heineken International
 Jules de Burlet (1844–1897), politician, senator, Interior Minister, Prime Minister, and Belgian ambassador to Portugal
 Julio Cortázar (1914–1984), novelist
 Kris Bosmans (b. 1980), cyclist
 Leo Joseph Suenens (1904–1996), cardinal
 Marc Dutroux (b. 1956), convicted child molester and serial killer 
 Marc Moulin (1942–2008), jazz and fusion musician, author
 Michel de Ghelderode (1898–1962), avant-garde dramatist
 Natacha Régnier (b. 1974), actress
 Paul Hymans (1865–1941), politician and President of the League of Nations
 Paul Saintenoy (1862–1952), architect, teacher, architectural historian, and writer
 Pierre Kolp (b. 1969), composer
 Pierre Rapsat (1948–2002), singer
 Sophie Wilmès (b. 1975), former Prime Minister
 Ursula von der Leyen (b. 1958), former German Federal Minister for Labour and Social Affairs and Minister of Defence, President of the European Commission
 Yannick Carrasco (b. 1993), football player

Lived in Ixelles:

 Anna Boch (1848–1936), artist and art collector, owner of the Villa Anna
 Antoine Wiertz (1806–1865), painter and sculptor
 August de Boeck (1865–1937), composer, organist, and music pedagogue
 Auguste Rodin (1840–1917), sculptor
 Charles de Coster (1827–1879), novelist
 Constantin Meunier (1831–1905), painter and sculptor
 Edith Cavell (1865–1915), British nurse and World War I martyr, ran a nursing school there from 1907.
 Elisée Reclus (1830–1905), geographer and anarchist
 Ernest Solvay (1838–1922), chemist, industrialist, and philanthropist
 Giacomo Puccini (1858–1924), Italian composer; lived and died at 1, /; a tablet with an inscription is visible on the building wall.
 Henriëtte Ronner-Knip (1821–1909), painter
 Jean-Baptiste Moens (1833–1908), philatelist and stamp dealer
 Jacky Ickx (b. 1945), racing driver
 Johan Michiel Dautzenberg (1834–1878), writer
 Karl Marx (1818–1883), German philosopher, social theorist, political economist, and socialist revolutionary
 Maria Malibran (1808–1836), mezzo-soprano
 Neel Doff (1858–1942), writer
 Octave Maus (1856–1919), art critic, writer, and lawyer
 Pierre-Joseph Proudhon (1809–1865), anarchist thinker
 Vladimir Lenin (1870–1924), Russian revolutionary and first head of the Soviet Union

References

Notes

External links

 Official website 
 Museum of Ixelles 

 
Municipalities of the Brussels-Capital Region
Populated places in Belgium